The Confédération internationale des étudiants (International Confederation of Students) was an international student organization that existed from 1919 to 1940. It was founded at the Strasbourg Congress of the Union nationale des étudiants de France (National Union of Students of France), and brought together representatives of national unions of students from different countries. The organization ran the World University Games. It also promoted student travel and worked with the League of Nations to advance students' interests.

Further reading 
 Laqua, Daniel. Activism in the "Students' League of Nations": International Student Politics and the Confédération Internationale des Étudiants, 1919–1939. The English Historical Review, Volume 132, Issue 556, June 2017.

International student organizations
International sports organizations
Student organizations established in 1919
Sports organizations established in 1919
Organizations disestablished in 1940